Adak is İzel's debut studio album. It was released in June 1995. The album mainly has a Pop folk sound. Most of the lyrics were written by Ercan Saatçi.

Track listing

Personnel
İzel: Main Vocal, Backing Vocals
Bendeniz, Eda Özülkü, Emel Müftüoğlu, Kenan Doğulu, Metin Özülkü, Seden Gürel, Toygarhan Atuner, Ufuk Mercan, Yıldız Tilbe: Backing Vocals
Ercan Saatçi: Keyboards, Backing Vocals
Ozan Çolakoğlu: Keyboards
Aykut Gürel, Keyboards, Backing Vocals, Classical Guitar, Electric Bass
Erdinç Şenyaylar: Acoustic, Electric and Classical Guitars
Adnan Ergil: Classical Guitars
Metin Özülkü: Backing Vocals, Classical Guitar
Eyüp Hamiş: Ney
Çetin Akdeniz: Baglama Saz, Bouzouki
Celal Bağlan, Seyfi Hayta: Percussion
İbrahim Şentürker: Viola
Şenyaylar Yaylı Grubu: Strings

Production
Produced by Aykut Gürel and Ercan Saatçi
Recorded by Aykut Gürel and Aytuğ Öndeş
Recorded at Düet Yapım
Mixed by Aykut Gürel, except tracks 1 and 7 (mixed by Peter Thomas)
Mixed at Düet Yapım and Music Box Studios
Mastered by Duyal Karagözoğlu
Mastered at Raks Marşandiz Stüdyoları

Music videos

External links 
 Adak – Discogs

İzel Çeliköz albums
1995 debut albums